Michel Aoun (born June 2, 1959 in Damour, Lebanon) is the current Eparch of the Maronite Catholic Eparchy of Byblos.

Life

Michel Aoun received on 9 June 1984 his priestly ordination.

Pope Benedict XVI confirmed on 16 January 2012 his election as Eparch of Byblos. Maronite Patriarch of Antioch, Cardinal Bechara Boutros al-Rahi, OMM, ordained him on 25 February 2012 to the episcopate. His co-consecrators were Samir Mazloum, retired Curial bishop of Antioch, and Paul Youssef Matar, Archeparch of Beirut. Aoun was introduced into the office on 26 February of the same year.

References

External links

 http://www.gcatholic.org/dioceses/diocese/jbei0.htm

1959 births
Living people
21st-century Maronite Catholic bishops
Lebanese religious leaders
Lebanese Maronites